, known professionally as  is a former member of the Japanese idol girl group NMB48. She was a member of NMB48's Team M. She left the group on April 3, 2015. Her younger sister, Suzu Yamada (born Suzu Nakayama), is also a former member of NMB48, and
her younger brother, Yuma Nakayama, is an actor represented by Johnny & Associates.

Biography 
In 2005, Yamada passed Hello Project's Kansai auditions. She graduated from being a trainee member in April 2008 and debuted under the group "SI☆NA" with 3 other ex-trainees from Hello Project. In July 2009, she graduated from "SI☆NA".

Yamada later passed NMB48's 1st generation auditions in September 2010. Her audition song was "Shoujo A" by Akina Nakamori. Her debut was on October 9, 2010. Her stage debut was on January 1, 2011. In March 2011, she was selected to Team N. Her first NMB48 Senbatsu was for Zetsumetsu Kurokami Shōjo.

In the 2012 AKB48 general elections, Yamada ranked for the first time, placing 46th with 6,683 votes.

In April 2013, during NMB48's Request Hour Setlist Best 30, Yamada was transferred to Team M. She started activities as a Team M member in May 2013. In the 2013 general elections, her rank improved and she placed 28th with 23,950 votes.

In February 2014, during AKB48's Group Shuffle, Yamada was appointed the captain of Team M and also started holding a concurrent position in SKE48's Team KII. In the 2014 general elections, she placed 29th with 23,299 votes.

In October 2014, Yamada announced her graduation during NMB48's 4th Anniversary Live. She graduated on her birthday, April 3, 2015.

On March 31, 2021, Yamada retired from entertainment industry.

Discography

NMB48 singles

SKE48 singles

AKB48 singles

Appearances

Stage Units
NMB48 Kenkyuusei Stage "Dareka no Tame ni"
 "Shinkirou"
 "Seifuku ga Jama wo Suru"

Team N 1st Stage "Dareka no Tame ni"
 "Shinkirou"
 "Seifuku ga Jama wo Suru"

Team N 2nd Stage "Seishun Girls"
 "Kinjirareta Futari"
 "Fushidara na Natsu"

Team M 1st Stage "Idol no Yoake"
 "Kuchi Utsushi no Chocolate"

Team KII 3rd Stage "Ramune no Nomikata" (Revival)
 "Manazashi, Sayonara"

Team M 2nd Stage "RESET"
 "Kokoro no Hashi no Sofa"

Movies
 NMB48 Geinin! THE MOVIE Owarai Seishun Girls! (2013)
 Mustard Chocolate (2017)

Variety Shows
 AKBINGO!
 Shukan AKB
 AKB MOTOR CLUB

TV dramas
 Isharyō Bengoshi: Anata no Namida, Okane ni Kaemashō (NTV, 2014) as Sara Mizutani

Stages
 Taylor Burton: Ubawareta Hihō (Sōgetsu Hall, 2015)
 Super Danganronpa 2 The Stage: Sayonara Zetsubō Gakuen (Zepp Blue Theater Roppongi, 2015)
 Tokyo Ivonnu the 11th performance Antonín Dvorak Symphony No.9 From the New World (Square Ebara Hiratsuka Hall, 2016)

Bibliography

Photobooks
 Yamada Nana 4+3=7: NMB48 Sotugyō Memorial Photobook (24 April 2015), Kobunsha,

External links
  
 Official Blog

References

1992 births
Living people
Japanese idols
Japanese television personalities
People from Osaka Prefecture
Musicians from Osaka Prefecture
NMB48 members
SKE48 members